1942 in philosophy

Events 
 American Society for Aesthetics was founded in 1942.

Publications 
 C. S. Lewis, The Screwtape Letters (1942)
 Stephen Pepper, World Hypotheses (1942)

Philosophical literature 
 Albert Camus, The Stranger (1942)

Births 
 January 24 - Melvin Fitting, American logician
 February 24 - Gayatri Chakravorty Spivak 
 March 28 - Daniel Dennett 
 April 12 - Ellen Meiksins Wood (died 2016)
 April 22 - Giorgio Agamben 
 April 26 - John Deely
 October 21 - Paul Churchland 
 December 11 Derek Parfit (died 2017)
 John McDowell (unspecified) (born 1942)

Deaths 
 February 22 - Stefan Zweig (born 1881)
 April 15 - Robert Musil (born 1880)
 December 21 - Franz Boas (born 1858)

References 

Philosophy
20th-century philosophy
Philosophy by year